Coleophora stuposa is a moth of the family Coleophoridae that can be found in Turkestan and Uzbekistan.

The larvae feed on Salsola gemmascens. They create a silky, very compact case with a cover. This cover is cloth-like and dense. The valve is three-sided and short. The color of the cover is gray, while the silky base is brown, with five to six indistinct but lustrous longitudinal lines partially obliterated by surrounding pubescence. The case of the young larvae is whitish-gray. Larvae can be found from September to October.

References

External links

stuposa
Moths of Asia
Moths described in 1992